Justise Hairston (born June 27, 1983) is a former American football running back. He was drafted by the New England Patriots in the sixth round of the 2007 NFL Draft. He played college football at Central Connecticut State University (CCSU).

College career
Hairston attended Rutgers University for three seasons. He was a backup for the Scarlet Knights while playing there before transferring to CCSU. With CCSU in 2006, Hairston set a school record for the most rushing yards in a season with over 1,800. He was also the second player from CCSU ever drafted by an NFL team.

Awards and honors
 ECAC All-Star (2006)
 AFCA I-AA All-American (2006)
 Third-team AP All-American (2006)
 Walter Payton Award finalist (2006)

Professional career

New England Patriots
Hairston was drafted by the New England Patriots in the sixth round (208th overall) of the 2007 NFL Draft. On August 1, 2007, Hairston was waived/injured by the Patriots, cleared waivers, and was placed on injured reserve. He reached an injury settlement with the team and was released on September 11.

Indianapolis Colts
On October 4, 2007, Hairston was signed to the practice squad of the Indianapolis Colts. Later in October he was released by the Colts. He was re-signed by the Colts after the season but was waived again by the team on June 16, 2008.

Buffalo Bills
Hairston was signed by the Buffalo Bills on June 8, 2009. On July 29, 2009, he was waived by the Bills.

External links
Buffalo Bills bio
Indianapolis Colts bio
New England Patriots bio

1983 births
Living people
Players of American football from Connecticut
American football running backs
Rutgers Scarlet Knights football players
Central Connecticut Blue Devils football players
New England Patriots players
Indianapolis Colts players
Buffalo Bills players
Sportspeople from New Britain, Connecticut